This is a list of foreign nationals who have been detained in North Korea. Excluded from the list are any persons who were detained while on active military duty and held as prisoners of war or military defectors. Also excluded are people abducted in other countries and brought into North Korea.

Detained Australians

Detained South Korean citizens

Detained U.S. citizens

Other detained foreign citizens

See also 

 Americans in North Korea
 Hostage diplomacy
 North Korean abductions of Japanese citizens
 North Korean abductions of South Koreans
 North Korea–United States relations

Notes

References 

North Korea
North Korea–United States relations
Americans detained by North Korea
North Korea Detained
Lists of prisoners and detainees